Ali Fakhreddine (born in Lebanon on April 3, 1983) is a retired professional Lebanese basketball player who most recently played for the team Sagesse Club.  He was also a member of the Lebanon national basketball team as a Forward-Center. He is 2.02 m tall (6 ft 8 in).

External links
Profile at asia-basket.com
Profile at FIBA.com

Living people
Lebanese men's basketball players
Power forwards (basketball)
1983 births
Centers (basketball)
2010 FIBA World Championship players
2006 FIBA World Championship players
Sagesse SC basketball players